Grigory Zakharovich Eliseev (6 February (25 January) 1821, village Spasskoe, Kainsk district, Tomsk Governorate, Russian Empire – 30 (18) January 1891, Saint Petersburg, Russian Empire) was a Russian journalist, editor, and publisher.

He was best known for his work in Sovremennik magazine where, after the death of Nikolay Dobrolyubov and the arrest of Nikolay Chernyshevsky he was the leading figure in the mid-1860s. Eliseev, using numerous pseudonyms (Grytsko being the best known), headed the "Domestic affairs review" department of Sovremennik and, according to Brockhaus and Efron Encyclopedic Dictionary was later regarded as the founder of this particular reviewing genre in Russian journalism. Eliseev, a respected religious scholar, was also the author of two profound studies on the history of early Christianity in the Kazan region.

References 

1821 births
1891 deaths
People from Novosibirsk Oblast
People from Tomsk Governorate
Journalists from the Russian Empire
Male writers from the Russian Empire
Russian editors
19th-century journalists from the Russian Empire
Russian male journalists
19th-century male writers from the Russian Empire